Wart lichen may refer to lichens in different genera, which are not all in the same family:

Porina
Pyrenula
Staurothele
Verrucaria